is Toei Company's thirty-second installment in the Super Sentai metaseries of Japanese tokusatsu television series. It aired from February 17, 2008 to February 8, 2009, replacing Juken Sentai Gekiranger and was replaced by Samurai Sentai Shinkenger. The program was part of TV Asahi's 2008 Super Hero Time block alongside Kamen Rider Kiva. Its footage was used for the American series, Power Rangers RPM and was dubbed into Korean as Power Rangers Engine Force (파워레인저 엔진포스). 

Story

Losing, Gaiark's three Pollution Ministers' escape leaves them on Earth, seeing the Human World as an easier location to create their ideal paradise. The six Engines manage to pursue them, selecting five humans to become their partners, the Go-ongers. The team are joined by Go-on Wings and their Wing Engines, as well as the Ancient Engines, as they all together battle the Gaiark as well as other evil villains from other Braneworlds.

Episodes

The eyecatch has the five main Engines racing, with a different one winning each week (or all in the last episode).

Production
The trademark for the series was filed by Toei Company on September 28, 2007.

Films

Boom Boom! Bang Bang! GekijōBang!!

 was released in theaters on August 9, 2008, as a double bill with the Kamen Rider Kiva movie, King of the Castle in the Demon World. The film features guest stars Sonim, Jyunichi Haruta (previously in Kagaku Sentai Dynaman and Dai Sentai Goggle V), Kento Handa (previously in Kamen Rider 555), Mika Kikuchi (previously in Tokusou Sentai Dekaranger), Naoya Uchida (previously in Denshi Sentai Denziman), and Masaya Matsukaze (previously in Denji Sentai Megaranger). The events of the movie take place between GPs 31 and 32.

Go-onger vs. Gekiranger

Initially scheduled for DVD release on March 21, 2009,  will feature the return of Hiroki Suzuki, Mina Fukui, Manpei Takagi, Riki Miura, Sotaro, Hirofumi Araki, Yuka Hirata, Naoki Kawano, and Kazue Itoh reprising their roles as Jyan Kandou, Ran Uzaki, Retu Fukami, Gou Fukami, Ken Hisatsu, Rio, Mere, Long, and Miki Masaki from Juken Sentai Gekiranger. To defeat their common foes, the Go-ongers, the Go-on Wings, and the Gekirangers team up with the revived Rio and Mere to fight the new evil team and stop them from releasing Long.

On December 6, 2008, several of the cast members of Go-onger announced on their blogs that there is going to be a second Go-onger movie. The next day, Toei announced on its Go-onger website that the film was going to be Go-onger vs. Gekiranger, and that it was to commemorate the 15th of the Super Sentai V-Cinema VS Series, having started initially with J.A.K.Q. Dengekitai vs. Gorenger in 1978 and revived annually with Chouriki Sentai Ohranger vs. Kakuranger in 1996. The film was released to theaters on January 24, 2009. The events of the movie take place between GPs 37 and 38.

Shinkenger vs. Go-onger

 was released in theaters on January 30, 2010, featuring a crossover between the Samurai Sentai Shinkenger and Go-onger casts and characters. The heroes of Tensou Sentai Goseiger also make a cameo appearance in the film.

10 Years Grand Prix

 was released direct-to-video on September 26, 2018, to commemorate the 10th anniversary of the premiere of the series, unlike the two other 10 Years After films Ninpuu Sentai Hurricaneger: 10 Years After and Tokusou Sentai Dekaranger: 10 Years After which take place 10 years after the finale.

Special DVD
 is a special DVD in which Bomper lets each of the Go-ongers do their own special seminar on ecology and also tie into the three Gaiark Pollution Ministers. Sōsuke and Gunpei start by helping Renn show how water and oil can't be mixed as Speedor covers Kegalesia and her Water Savage Machine Beasts. Then Hanto shows how clean air is essential for people in an exercise experiment that nearly suffocates Gunpei from breathing in too much polluted air and being saved by inhaling helium by mistake as Speedor explains about Kitaneidas and his Savage Air Machine Beasts along with the Go-on Wings. After Gunpei's voice returns to normal, Saki begins her lesson though unaware she was supposed to teach a lesson though she grew strawberries from polluted soil and made a cake from strawberries that she grew in clean soil. As Sōsuke and Gunpei get the tea for her, Speedor talks about Yogostien and his Savage Machine Beasts, as well Hiramechimedes and all the events leading to Yogostein's death. The last seminar is cut short when Hiramechimedes' cross-dressing older brother Kokorootomedes goes after Sōsuke out of revenge, but is destroyed by Go-on Red's Kankan Kong Express Speedor Version after a tough fight. Just as Gunpei decides to give a seminar on how to be cool like himself, Bomper says that they are out of time and the seminars are over. The events of the specials take place between GPs 37 and 38.

Cast
: 
: 
: 
: 
: 
: 
: 
: 

Voice actors
: 
: 
: 
: 
: 
: 
: 
: 
: 
: 
, : 
: 
:

Guests
: 
: 
Gang Father (13): 
: 
: 
: 
: 
: 
: 
: 
Butler (48):

International broadcast

Songs
Opening theme

Lyrics: 
Composition: Takafumi Iwasaki
Arrangement: Project. R (Keinichiro Ōishi & Takafumi Iwasaki)
Artist: 

Ending themes

Lyrics: Mike Sugiyama & 
Composition & Arrangement: Kenichiro Ōishi (Project. R)
Artist: Project.R (Sister MAYO) with the 
Starting with episode 9 to 13, and 15 to 17, the second verse from "Engine First Lap -Type Normal-" was used as the ending theme, switching from the verse about Speedor to the verse about Bus-on. BearRV's verse was used as the ending theme in episode 18.

Lyrics: Mike Sugiyama & 
Composition & Arrangement: Kenichiro Ōishi (Project. R)
Artist: Project. R (Takayoshi Tanimoto, Sister MAYO, Kenichiro Ōishi) with the Engine Kids
Starting with episode 22, the third verse from "Engine Second Lap -TURBO CUSTOM-", Carrigator's verse, was used as the ending theme as a way to promote the movie. It was played again, from episodes 27 to 30, with Birca's verse. It then was resumed, in episode 32, with Gunpherd's verse.

Lyrics: Mike Sugiyama
Composition & Arrangement: Kenichiro Ōishi
Artist: Engine Kids with Project. R (Takayoshi Tanimoto, Sister MAYO, Kenichiro Ōishi)
This version of the ending theme, first used at the end of episode 23 and later used as the ending theme to the It's a Seminar! Everyone GO-ON DVD features the Engine Kids singing and members of Project. R singing back up. As the title suggests, the song discusses ecology and recycling.

Lyrics: Mike Sugiyama
Composition & Arrangement: Kenichiro Ōishi
Artist: Project. R (Takayoshi Tanimoto, Hideaki Takatori, Sister MAYO, Hideyuki Takahashi, Takafumi Iwasaki, YOFFY, Mayumi Gojo, Kenichiro Ōishi) with Engine the Kids
This version of the ending theme, first used at the end of episode 25, is also the ending theme for the movie.

Lyrics: Mike Sugiyama
Composition & Arrangement: Kenichiro Ōishi
Artist: 
This version of the ending theme is used in episode 31 as both an insert song and an ending theme, featuring the G3 Princess idol group (Saki, Miu, and Kegalesia) singing. Included in G3 Princess CD Box set, there will be an arrangement of "G3 Princess Lap ~PRETTY LOVELimited~" for each of the members of G3 Princess as well as their character songs. The G3 Princess Lap ~PRETTY LOVELimited~ mini-album also includes the title song, the character songs, as well as "Engine Sentai Go-onger," "Engine First Lap -Type Normal," and "Engine Eco Lap -RECYCLE CUSTOM-."

Lyrics: Mike Sugiyama & 
Composition & Arrangement: Kenichiro Ōishi (Project.R)
Artist: Project.R (YOFFY, Hideaki Takatori, Mayumi Gojo, Takayoshi Tanimoto, Sister MAYO, Kenichiro Ōishi) with the Engine Kids
Starting with episode 36 to 37, the first verse, Toripter's verse, was used. Then as of episodes 38 and 39, the second verse, Jetras' verse, was used as the ending theme. In episode 40, the third verse, Jum-bowhale's verse, was used.  is also noted as the artist of the song on the complete song collection.

Lyrics: Mike Sugiyama & 
Composition & Arrangement: Kenichiro Ōishi (Project.R)
Artist: Project.R (Hideyuki Takahashi, Takayoshi Tanimoto, Sister MAYO, Kenichiro Ōishi) with the Engine Kids
Starting with episode 42, the first verse, Kishamoth's verse, was used. In episode 43, it was switched to T-line's verse, the second verse. Then K-line's verse, the third verse, was used in episode 44. It was included on the complete song collection, released on January 14, 2009, which came with a toy Engine Soul that plays the ending theme melody.

Lyrics: Mike Sugiyama & 
Composition & Arrangement: Kenichiro Ōishi (Project.R)
Artist:  with Bomper (Akiko Nakagawa)

Lyrics: Mike Sugiyama & 
Composition & Arrangement: Kenichiro Ōishi (Project.R)
Artist: Project.R (Hideyuki Takahashi, Takayoshi Tanimoto, Sister MAYO, Hideaki Takatori, Mayumi Gojo, YOFFY, Takafumi Iwasaki, IMAJO, Kenichiro Ōishi) with Engine Kids

The single of the opening and ending themes comes in two versions, one of which is the limited edition  version that includes a limited edition toy Engine Soul that plays the opening theme melody. It is the first Super Sentai theme song single to ever make it onto the Oricon charts' top ten list, reaching #4 on the weekly singles chart by selling 22,000 records in its first week. It had started out at #3 on the daily singles chart on its first day of sale, March 19, 2008, peaking at #2 on March 20, 2008. It had remained in the top 20 of the weekly charts for four weeks, and became the #113 top selling single on the Oricon's yearly rankings. As part of a Kodomo no Hi report, the Oricon listed "Engine Sentai Go-onger" as the #1 tokusatsu hero karaoke request, ahead of songs such as AAA DEN-O form's "Climax Jump" for Kamen Rider Den-O and V6's "TAKE ME HIGHER" for Ultraman Tiga.

Notes

References

External links

 at Toei Company
 at Super-Sentai.net
 at Nippon Columbia

2008 Japanese television series debuts
2009 Japanese television series endings
Super Sentai
Japanese television series with live action and animation
Television series about animals